Sara Duncan may refer to:

 Sara Jeannette Duncan (1861–1922), Canadian author and journalist
 Sara J. Duncan (1869–?), African American social activist